Jenssen is a Norwegian patronymic surname meaning "son of Jens".  The prefix "Jens-" is a Danish and Frisian derivative of Johannes. There are alternate spellings, including the Danish Jensen, the English language Jenson, and the Belgian/Dutch language Janson. Jenssen is uncommon as a given name.  People with the name Jenssen include:

 Amanda Jenssen (born 1988), Swedish singer
 Elois Jenssen (1922-2004), American film and television costume designer
 Geir Jenssen, Norwegian musician best known under the recording name Biosphere
 Hans Jørgen Darre-Jenssen (1864-1950), Norwegian politician
Hans Wiers-Jenssen (1866–1925),  Norwegian novelist
 Jens Martin Arctander Jenssen (1885-1968), Norwegian politician
Jens Peter Book-Jenssen (1910–1999), Norwegian singer 
Johan Henrik Wiers-Jenssen (1897–1951), Norwegian newspaper columnist 
Lauritz Jenssen (1837–1899), Norwegian businessperson and politician 
Lauritz Dorenfeldt Jenssen (1801–1859), Norwegian businessperson
Leif Jenssen,  Norwegian weightlifter 
Lene Jenssen, Norwegian swimmer
Matz Jenssen (1760–1813), Norwegian businessperson
Ruben Yttergård Jenssen, Norwegian footballer
Worm Hirsch Darre-Jenssen (1870-1945), Norwegian politician

See also 
 Jens (disambiguation)
 Jensen (disambiguation)
 Jenson (disambiguation)
 Janson (disambiguation)

Norwegian-language surnames
Germanic-language surnames
Surnames of Frisian origin
Patronymic surnames